Aloe meyeri  is a succulent plant species from  South Africa. The species was first formally described by Ernst Jacobus van Jaarsveld in 1981.

References

External links 
 'Aloe meyeri'  The Plant List
 'Aloe meyeri'  Encyclopedia of Life

meyeri